Oxanorbornadiene (OND) is a bicyclic organic compound with an oxygen atom bridging the two opposing saturated carbons of 1,4-cyclohexadiene. OND is related to all-carbon bicycle norbornadiene.

Synthesis

While unsubstituted OND is known, the most useful OND derivatives are dialkyl OND-2,3-dicarboxylates, readily obtainable by a Diels–Alder cycloaddition between furans and acetylenedicarboxylates such as DMAD.

Properties
OND-2,3-dicarboxylates (thereafter referred to as OND) display unusually high reactivity towards organic azides and thiols. OND–thiol adducts are prone to retro-Diels–Alder fragmentation, which occurs with widely variable rates.

Reactions with Azides
ONDs react with organic azides to yield a mixture of four products, arising from initial 1,3-dipolar cycloaddition onto either of the two olefins, followed by a retro-Diels–Alder reaction (a cycloelimination reaction) to form 1,2,3-triazoles and furans. The intermediate triazolines avoid detection because of a very strong thermodynamic drive to collapse into two aromatic products. The relative preference of attack on either double bond is governed by the electronic nature of the azides. Electron-rich aliphatic azides, e.g. benzyl azide, react preferentially via their HOMO orbital. Interaction of the azide HOMO with LUMO orbital of the OND, localized on the electron-poor C-2 and C-3, leads the products consistent with path A. Electron-poor aryl azides, such as p-nitrophenyl azide, react, to a significant extent, via their LUMO orbitals, interacting with OND HOMO (C-5 and C-6), leading to higher amounts of path B products. The dipolar reactivity of OND with azides is unusually high for olefins, and even exceeds that of parent electron-poor alkyne DMAD.[2]

References

Oxygen heterocycles
Heterocyclic compounds with 2 rings